Thiotricha fridaella is a moth of the family Gelechiidae. It was described by Henry Legrand in 1958. It is found on the Seychelles, where it has been recorded from Mahé and Silhouette.

References

Moths described in 1958
Thiotricha